Mack Magaha (August 1, 1929 – August 15, 2003) was an American bluegrass fiddler best known as a member of Porter Wagoner's band, and a long-time backup player in the pioneering bluegrass band, Reno and Smiley.

Music career
In 1955, Magaha joined Reno and Smiley as a member of the Tennessee Cutups. Together with Don Reno he wrote the popular song "I know You're Married But I Love You Still" which was recorded by Reno & Smiley. It was later covered by artists such as Bill Anderson, Rodney Crowell, Jan Howard, Patty Loveless, Jimmy Martin, Red Sovine, and Travis Tritt. In 1964, he joined Porter Wagoner's Wagonmasters. During the 1960s, he worked as an old-time fiddler on The Porter Wagoner Show and later worked with the aspiring female star on the show, Dolly Parton.  Among the later songs Magaha wrote, "We'll Get Ahead Someday" provided a top-ten country single for Wagoner and Parton in 1968, one of their first duet hits.

He became a regular performer at the theme park Opryland USA in the 1970s. He died at age 74 at Nashville's Veterans Hospital.

Magaha was known as Nashville's Dancing Fiddle Man. Magaha, like Curly Ray Cline, had a fiery stage presence doing his dancelike movements while he was fiddling.

Notes

References
 Black, Bob (2005), Come Hither To Go Yonder: Playing Bluegrass With Bill Monroe, University of Illinois Press
 Ledgin, Stephanie P. (2004), Homegrown Music: Discovering Bluegrass, Greenwood Publishing Group
 Malone, Bill C. (2002), Country Music U.S.A., University of Texas Press
 Tribe, Ivan M. (2006), Country: A Regional Exploration, Greenwood Publishing Group

External links
 http://www.cmt.com/news/news-in-brief/1476968/funeral-services-held-for-fiddler-mack-magaha.jhtml

1929 births
2003 deaths
American bluegrass fiddlers
20th-century American musicians